is a 2011 Japanese film directed by Yoshihiro Fukagawa. It is based on a bestselling novel of the same name written by Sosuke Natsukawa.

Plot
Dr. Ichito Kurihara (Sho Sakurai) works at a clinic in Nagano Prefecture. He rarely has any free time due to the clinic's shortage of doctors and the constant influx of patients. He even sometimes diagnoses patients out of his area of specialty and sometimes goes days without sleeping. He hopes to work at a major hospital where he can get more free time to spend with his wife, Haruna (Aoi Miyazaki), and to specialize in his field of study. However, he is also reluctant to add to shortage of doctors at the clinic and break his relationships with the patients.

One day, he clears out the belongings of a terminal cancer patient who died and discovers a letter written to him thanking him for the care he provided to her, even though he could not cure her sickness. He then has a revelation about the medical chart he keeps in his hand - filled with personal observations and concerns.

Cast
 Sho Sakurai, from the band Arashi, stars in this film as Ichito Kurihara. Kurihara is a physician who works at a clinic in Nagano Prefecture.
 Aoi Miyazaki plays Haruna, Kurihara's wife and a mountain photographer.
 Jun Kaname
 Michiko Kichise
 Yoshinori Okada
 Aki Asakura
 Taizo Harada
 Tokuma Nishioka
 Chizuru Ikewaki
 Mariko Kaga
 Akira Emoto

Release
Kamisama no Karute was released in Japanese cinemas on 27 August 2011 on 321 screens.

Reception

Box office
Kamisama no Karute grossed around 302.85 million yen on its first weekend, making it the highest-grossing film in the Japanese box office for the weekend of 27–28 August 2011. About 240,000 went to watch the film over the weekend, of whom over half were middle school students. According to the film's official website, females outnumbered the male audience by a ratio of 93 to 7. It reached the 1 million audience mark on 13 September 2011.

References

External links
  
 

Films directed by Yoshihiro Fukagawa
Japanese drama films
2010s Japanese-language films
2011 films
Films based on Japanese novels
Films set in hospitals